The Reök Palace is an Art Nouveau building in downtown Szeged. It was designed by Ede Magyar and built in 1907. It hosts exhibitions of modern fine arts.

External links
Official website

Buildings and structures in Szeged